Vasile Stan (born 11 February 1945) is a Romanian former football goalkeeper.

Honours
Argeș Pitești
Divizia A: 1971–72

References

External links
Vasile Stan at Labtof.ro

1945 births
Living people
Romanian footballers
Association football goalkeepers
Liga I players
Liga II players
CSM Jiul Petroșani players
FC Argeș Pitești players
Victoria București players
FC Politehnica Iași (1945) players
Footballers from Bucharest